Tonight's the Night is a BBC light entertainment television programme which was shown on BBC One from 18 April 2009 to 3 December 2011, presented by actor and singer John Barrowman.

Format
The show is based around making audience members' wishes come true, featuring ordinary people living out their fantasies for real.

There are no rules as to who can appear on the show; it features ordinary members of the public nominated by friends who think they have a hidden talent or other special reason. Every guest has the help of Barrowman and other celebrity guests.

The studio audience are also involved in the show, as John surprises unsuspecting members of the public, making their wishes come true on the night even if they hadn't signed up for the show.

It contains at its heart elements of classic 1980s entertainment shows, such as Surprise, Surprise, Jim'll Fix It, and Beadle's About.

Transmissions

Doctor Who Sketch
A short Doctor Who sketch aired as part of the 23 May 2009 episode. It featured John Barrowman reprising his role as Jack Harkness, David Tennant as himself, and competition winner Tim Ingham as alien Sao Til. In the short, set on the TARDIS, Barrowman and Ingham alternate between playing their characters and playing themselves as actors on the TARDIS set.

Indian adaptation
An Indian adaptation of the show titled Aaj Ki Raat Hai Zindagi, premiered on STAR Plus on 18 October 2015.

References

External links
 
 
 

BBC television game shows
2009 British television series debuts
2011 British television series endings
BBC high definition shows
English-language television shows
Television game shows with incorrect disambiguation